The 1985 New Zealand rugby union tour of Argentina was a series of matches played in October and November 1985 in Argentina by New Zealand national rugby union team.

The national side played 7 matches, with 6 won and 1 draw in the second test v. Argentina, when fly-half Hugo Porta scored 21 points (four penalties and three drop goals) for Argentina. Porta would be named "the best fly-half of the world" at the end of that year.

Matches

Summary 
List of matches played by New Zealand in Argentina:

 Test matches

Match details

References

NZL
tour
tour
New Zealand national rugby union team tours
Rugby union tours of Argentina